Beau Jocque (born Andrus Espre; November 1, 1953 – September 10, 1999) was a Louisiana French Creole zydeco musician and songwriter active in the 1990s.

Beau Jocque is known for his gruff vocals, his fusion of many musical styles into zydeco, and above all, for the powerful energy of his rhythm and sound.  Backed by the Hi-Rollers, he became one of the top dance-hall acts of his musical decade. He wrote, recorded and performed many songs in both Louisiana French and Louisiana Creole languages, as well as in English, primarily on the Rounder Records label.

Early life
Beau Jocque was born Andrus Espre in Duralde, Louisiana to Sandrus and Vernice (née Allen) Espre. His father (nicknamed "Tee Toe") was a well-respected accordion player who performed at many local dances, but who quit playing music when Andrus' older brother was born. Andrus played guitar in a high school band but his influences were not zydeco musicians but rather acts such as War, ZZ Top, Stevie Ray Vaughan, James Brown, Sly and the Family Stone, and Santana.

He enlisted in the Air Force after high school, and eventually made it to the rank of sergeant, had a top security clearance and was stationed in London and Germany. He once escorted Henry Kissinger around Europe. Espre had his first near-death experience while in the Air Force, when an explosion left him in the hospital with amnesia. He spent nine years in the military, then came home to work as an electrician and welder. He was a long time resident of Kinder, Louisiana. He was also known to write poetry, and preach about respecting nature.

Career
Working in an oil refinery after leaving the Air Force, Espre experienced a work-related accident on September 4, 1987, which left him temporarily paralyzed from the waist down. During his recuperation, as part of his therapy he began playing his father's button accordion. After a year of practice and gaining proficiency on the accordion, Espre and his wife Michelle (AKA Shelly) began to study the styles of the successful groups on the zydeco circuit. "We checked out C. J. Chenier, Buckwheat Zydeco, Boozoo Chavis, John Delafose and I'd watch the crowd. When they got real excited, I'd try to feel what was happening at that point. Was it the rhythm guitar? The drums? The accordion style? I realized that when you get the whole thing just right, it's going to move the crowd."

Espre grew up speaking Louisiana Creole French and spoke it fluently. In 1991, he put a band together, including his wife Shelly on rubboard. They initially talked themselves into a few gigs in small clubs or for trail ride parties, and word spread quickly about a new zydeco artist. He especially appealed to a younger crowd by incorporating rock guitar solos, blues-rock beats, and rap lines into his songs, along with his bass vocals and growling lyrics. His initial recording got airplay on local radio stations and the larger zydeco clubs began to take notice. Within a short amount of time, Beau Jocque was playing clubs four to five nights a week and just a few years after his accident, Espre was one of the biggest draws on the Louisiana zydeco circuit. In June 1995 one newspaper stated that "There has simply never been a zydeco phenomenon like Beau Jocque and the Hi-Rollers" who have "thoroughly modernized zydeco". His major zydeco influence was Boozoo Chavis who also played the button accordion, with hypnotic riffs and two-step stomps that were favorites with south Louisiana dancers.

In 1995 Beau Jocque and the Zydeco Hi-Rollers were the headliners on the Rounder Records "Louisiana Red Hot Music Tour". In June 1999 they were a featured band at the first annual New Jersey Arts and Music Festival.

Beau Jocque and the Zydeco Hi-Rollers won the Big Easy Music Awards three times as Best Zydeco Artist.

Recordings
Beau Jocque's first recording was a 1992 vanity release titled My Name is Beau Jocque (Lanor Records 1031), which was re-issued in 1994 by Paula Records. Espre sent cassettes of this release to area radio stations and also sold them at his gigs. He had to re-order more copies because they sold very quickly.

Scott Billington, a producer for Rounder Records who was familiar with the Louisiana zydeco scene, picked up on the buzz surrounding Beau Jocque and signed him to his label. Beau Jocque Boogie was released in 1993, and it contained the song that became his first hit and signature song, "Give Him Cornbread". The song, written by Espre, includes elements of Willis Prudhomme's zydeco arrangement of "Shortnin' Bread" and FM's hip hop song "Gimme What You Got (For a Porkchop)". Audiences demanded that the band play that song multiple times at dances, and as the song gained popularity, fans would throw pieces of cornbread onto the stage. Beau Jocque Boogie became the highest-selling zydeco album ever.

Beau Jocque recorded five studio albums for Rounder, with a sixth live album titled Give Him Cornbread, Live released on the label posthumously in 2000. The label also issued two posthumous compilation albums. All were financial successes for both the label and the artist. His contract with Rounder was not exclusive, so Beau Jocque also recorded two albums for New Orleans-based Mardi Gras Records as well as a mini-CD on his own label.

Rivalry with Boozoo Chavis
Beau Jocque's rapid rise to the top of the zydeco circuit created some tension with the older musicians, who felt he hadn't paid his dues. Zydeco pioneer Boozoo Chavis even recorded a song called "Boozoo's Payback" that included the lyrics "He plays my music and he does me wrong, but he can't sing my song", directed at Beau Jocque.

But the rivalry was also good for business. The Mid-City Lanes Rock n' Bowl in New Orleans staged annual mock battles billed as "Boo vs. Beau" during the New Orleans Jazz & Heritage Festival, which each year drew more than 1,000 patrons and set attendance records at the venue. One year, Mick Jagger and Charlie Watts of The Rolling Stones paid the $5 admission charge to experience the showdown. One such "battle of the bands" was the centerpiece of a 1994 documentary film The Kingdom of Zydeco by director Robert Mugge.

It was a friendly rivalry. The two musicians often traded insults in public but they were supportive of each other in private. Beau Jocque often played Chavis' songs during his performances, and even performed at a benefit concert to raise money to pay the costs of surgery for Chavis' wife. In the 1994 film, both musicians admitted that the battle of the bands was a promotional gimmick.

The final "Boo vs. Beau" battle in New Orleans was held on May 2, 1999 at the Rock n' Bowl.

Personal life
Espre and his wife Michelle ("Shelly") had two sons, Andrus Adrian and Justin Travis.

In 1995, Espre suffered a heart attack in Austin, Texas while touring with Marcia Ball and Steve Riley and the Mamou Playboys. Radio stations in Louisiana had reported the 1995 heart attack was fatal, and he surprised his fans (including the town's mayor) by shortly thereafter appearing in the local supermarket in Kinder.

Death
On September 9, 1999, Beau Jocque and the Zydeco Hi-Rollers performed a two-set show at the Rock n' Bowl in New Orleans, and afterwards drove the approximately 200 miles on Interstate 10 back to Kinder. The next morning, Beau Jocque was found collapsed in the shower by his wife, dead of an apparent heart attack at the height of his career. He is buried in Saint Matilda Cemetery, Eunice, Louisiana.

Espre's death was preceded only two weeks earlier by the death of his father, Sandrus.

Hi-Rollers personnel
Members of the Hi-Rollers include:
 Chuck Bush (bass)
 Steve Charlot (drums)
 Russell "Sly" Dorion (guitar)
 Ray Johnson (guitar)
 Mike Lockett (keyboard)
 Wilfred Pierre (rubboard)

Discography

Studio and live albums

Singles and EPs

Various artist compilation albums

Filmography

Louisiana Blues (directed by Jean-Pierre Bruneau, 1993); Beau Jocque appears as himself in a film history of Cajun and Zydeco music.
The Kingdom of Zydeco (directed by Robert Mugge, 1994); Beau Jocque and Boozoo Chavis appear in this documentary which features their friendly rivalry while both were seeking to earn the title "King of Zydeco" following the deaths of Clifton Chenier and Rockin' Dopsie.
 By the River of Babylon: An Elegy for South Louisiana (TV documentary directed by Don Howard and Jim Shelton, 2015); includes music performances by Beau Jocque and Clifton Chenier.

Other media appearances
 Late Night with Conan O'Brien: June 26, 1995, episode 2.188
 Late Show with David Letterman: May 15, 1998; Beau Jocque & The Zydeco Hi-Rollers appeared on a special New Orleans episode

Awards
1994: Big Easy Music Awards, Best Zydeco Artist
1994: Beau Jocque and the Zydeco Hi-Rollers were voted Hottest Band at the inaugural Zydeco People's Choice Awards. Additionally, band member Classie Ballou was named as Best Bass Guitarist at the same awards ceremony.
 1995: Big Easy Music Awards, Best Zydeco Artist
1995: Beau Jocque's composition "Yesterday" (from his Pick Up On This! album) won the Best Song of the Year award at the Second Annual Zydeco People's Choice Awards. Hi-Rollers bandmate Ray Johnson also received the award for Best Lead Guitar Player.
 2000: Big Easy Music Awards, Best Zydeco Artist

References

Further reading

External links
 
 

1953 births
1999 deaths
20th-century American musicians
American accordionists
Musicians from Louisiana
People from Evangeline Parish, Louisiana
Rounder Records artists
Zydeco accordionists
20th-century accordionists
African-American Catholics